Kandula Obul Reddy was a Freedom Fighter and a former General Secretary of Congress for Andhra. He was also an ex-Cabinet Minister (1955) and Minister for Major Irrigation (1978), as well as the chairman for APSRTC & AP Agricultural University and Hon. Life President of AP Freedom Fighters Association.

The political family of Kandula Obul Reddy held undisputed sway on Cumbum constituency, Prakasam district.

Gundlakamma Reservoir Project 
Kandula Obul Reddy Gundlakamma Reservoir Project: Gundlakamma Reservoir Project is an irrigation project located in Prakasam district in Andhra Pradesh, India. The project named after Late Sri Kandula Obul Reddy will provide irrigation facilities to an ayacut of 80060 Acres (32400 Ha) under Rabi and 62368 Acres (25240 Ha) under Khariff for the lands covered in 6 Mandals and drinking water supply to 43 villages enroute and Ongole town Municipality round the year in Prakasam District.

Year of birth missing
Year of death missing
Andhra Pradesh politicians
Lok Sabha members from Andhra Pradesh
India MPs 1977–1979
India MPs 1980–1984
Indian National Congress politicians from Andhra Pradesh